Jean-François Sauvé (born January 23, 1960) is a Canadian former professional ice hockey centre.  He played in the National Hockey League with the Buffalo Sabres and Quebec Nordiques.

Biography
Sauve was born in Sainte-Geneviève, Quebec. As a youth, he played in the 1972 and 1973 Quebec International Pee-Wee Hockey Tournaments with a minor ice hockey teams from Pierrefonds, Quebec, and from the North shore of Montreal. In his NHL career, Sauvé appeared in 290 games. He scored sixty-five goals and added 138 assists.

Sauvé is the brother of former NHL goaltender Bob Sauvé and the uncle of former NHL goaltender Philippe Sauvé. Sauvé's son Maxime (born 1990) was selected 47th overall by the Boston Bruins in the 2008 NHL Entry Draft, and played one NHL game with the team. His nephew, Philippe Sauvé is a NHL hockey player like his brother, Robert Sauve.

Career statistics

References

External links
 

1960 births
Adirondack Red Wings players
Buffalo Sabres players
Canadian ice hockey centres
Diables Noirs de Tours players
Fredericton Express players
HC Fribourg-Gottéron players
Living people
People from L'Île-Bizard–Sainte-Geneviève
Quebec Nordiques players
Rochester Americans players
Ice hockey people from Montreal
Trois-Rivières Draveurs players
Undrafted National Hockey League players